Arthur Ivor Brown (10 October 1903 – 3 April 1971) was a Welsh international footballer. A goalkeeper, he played for Aberdare Athletic, Reading, Port Vale, Crewe Alexandra, and Merthyr Town.

Career
Brown played for Aberdare Athletic and Reading before joining Port Vale in May 1929. During his time Aberdare Athletic F.C., Arthur gained his only international cap for Wales in the 1925–26 British Home Championship, playing against Ireland losing 3-0. Unable to dislodge either Jack Prince or Ben Davies, his sole game for the Port Vale was in a 2–1 win at Halifax Town on 31 August 1929. He was transferred to Crewe Alexandra in October of that year, and later played with Merthyr Town. Arthur died on the 3rd April 1971 in his hometown of Aberdate at the age of 67. His son, Malcolm Brown, was a Professor of Computational Mathematics at Cardiff University

Career statistics
Source:

References

Footballers from Aberdare
Welsh footballers
Wales international footballers
Association football goalkeepers
Aberdare Athletic F.C. players
Reading F.C. players
Port Vale F.C. players
Crewe Alexandra F.C. players
Merthyr Town F.C. players
English Football League players
1903 births
1971 deaths